I Still Do is the twentieth studio album by English musician Eric Clapton, and was released through the independent Bushbranch Records/Surfdog Records label. The album is a combination of new material written by Clapton and classic songs, contemporary tunes and influences interpreted in his own style.

The album was produced by Glyn Johns who had worked with Clapton on Slowhand (1977) and Backless (1978). The album's artwork is a painting of Clapton by Peter Blake who also previously worked with Clapton. It is the follow-up to Clapton's global hit album The Breeze: An Appreciation of JJ Cale, released in the summer of 2014, his compilation album Forever Man, released in the spring of 2015 and also his commercially successful concert film and live album Slowhand at 70 – Live at the Royal Albert Hall released in late 2015.

Production

The album was produced by Glyn Johns, who had been producer on Clapton's successful albums Slowhand (1977) and Backless (1978).

The album cover consists of a portrait of Clapton by Peter Blake who had previously designed multiple pages of artwork for Clapton's 1991 album 24 Nights as well as a photo book, containing all of his drawings of Clapton, his band and the Royal Albert Hall in which the album was recorded from 1990 to 1991.

Media interest was aroused by the listing of Angelo Mysterioso as contributing to "I Will Be There" as it is similar to L'Angelo Misterioso,  a pseudonym used occasionally by George Harrison. After Clapton refused to make an official statement, the media began to speculate whether it might be Dhani Harrison playing on the new release. A spokesman for Clapton told Examiner.com on 2 March 2016 that neither Clapton himself nor his management or Clapton's record companies will be revealing the actual identity of "Angelo Mysterioso". In a brief statement, the spokesman wrote: "We aren't going to be saying who it is. Now or ever [...]". Also, it was never officially approved or denied if Dhani Harrison appears on the release.  Ed Sheeran joined Clapton on stage at the Nippon Budokan Tokyo, Japan on 13 April 2016 for "I Will Be There", leading to speculation that he is in fact Angelo Mysterioso.  Sheeran also sang "Cypress Grove" and "Sunshine State" at the same concert. Since then, Sheeran's album ÷ was released, also crediting 'Angelo Mysterioso' with a guitar solo, leading to speculation of an arrangement between the two. Speaking to People magazine, Sheeran confirmed the collaboration.

Release and promotion
I Still Do was announced on 18 February 2016. The album is available as a digital download, on gramophone record (two vinyl discs, each with three songs per side and played at 45RPM for better audio) and on compact disc. There is also a limited edition vacuum tube shaped USB and CD release in a denim box with bonus materials. The bonuses include two exclusive tracks "Lonesome" and "Freight Train" plus 45 minutes of video featuring intimate interviews, behind the scenes clips of recording sessions, live performances and more, and 10 behind the scenes polaroid photo prints. Clapton's independent Bushbranch and Surfdog Records labels distribute the album to worldwide territories.

Critical reception

Jon M. Gilbertson, indicating in a review from Milwaukee Journal Sentinel, opines, "'I Still Do' is not a dramatic statement, but it is sturdy enough to earn another alternate title: 'I'm Still Here.'"

Andy Gill of The Independent praised the album, stating:

Track listing

Personnel
 Eric Clapton – guitar, tambourine, lead vocals
 Paul Brady – acoustic guitar, backing vocals
 Andy Fairweather Low – acoustic guitar, electric guitar, backing vocals
 Angelo Mysterioso – acoustic guitar (3), backing vocals (3)
 Simon Climie – acoustic guitar, electric guitar, keyboards
 Walt Richmond – keyboards
 Chris Stainton – keyboards
 Paul Carrack – Hammond organ, backing vocals
 Dirk Powell – accordion, mandolin, backing vocals
 Dave Bronze – bass guitar, double bass
 Henry Spinetti – drums, percussion
 Ethan Johns – percussion
 Michelle John – backing vocals
 Sharon White – backing vocals

Production
 Producer and Mixing – Glyn Johns
 Engineers – Martin Hollis and Glyn Johns
 Assistant Engineer – Rowan McIntosh
 Mastered by Bob Ludwig at Gateway Mastering (Portland, ME).
 Art Direction and Design – Catherine Roylance
 Layout – Brice Beckham
 Artwork Technician – Matthew Gordon
 Cover Painting – Sir Peter Blake
 Photography – Catherine Roylance, Nick Roylance, Craig Stecyk, Simon Whitehead and Getty Images.

Charts

Weekly charts

Year-end charts

Singles

References

2016 albums
Eric Clapton albums
Albums produced by Glyn Johns
Surfdog Records albums